Andrés Steven Rodríguez Ossa (born 13 October 1998), better known as Steven Rodríguez or Tití Rodríguez, is a Colombian professional footballer who plays as a striker for Categoría Primera A club Independiente Medellín.

Career

Independiente Medellín
Rodríguez began his football youth with Under-20 squad, in which he always stood out as a scorer in tournaments such as the National Under-20 Tournament and Antioquia League. In mid 2019 season, due to his outstanding performances in the youth team, he was promoted to the first team squad. He made his professional debut with the first team of Independiente Medellín on January 29, 2019, in the Categoría Primera A match against La Equidad under the manager Octavio Zambrano in a 1–1 draw.

Leones
On 15 January 2021 he was loaned to Leones to play the first season of the Categoría Primera B where he had an excellent performance being the tournament's top scorer with 16 goals in 19 matches.

Envigado
On 10 July 2021 he signed for Envigado on loan until the end of 2021 season. He played a total of 15 matches and scored two goals for the club.

Sri Pahang
He continued his loan spell to join Malaysia Super League side Sri Pahang FC on 29 May 2022 on a six-month loan deal. He scored his first goal with the club in a 2–5 defeat against Penang FC in the FA cup quarter finals. His first league goal for the club saw him scoring a solo-run goal in a 2–0 victory against long-term rival Selangor FC. At the end of the season he scored a total of 12 goals in 17 appearances.

Career Statistics
 (All competition)

Honours

National Champions

Individual Awards

References 

1998 births

Living people
Colombian expatriate footballers
Association football forwards
Sri Pahang FC players
Footballers from Medellín
Independiente Medellín footballers